Robert Sidney, 2nd Earl of Leicester (1 December 1595 – 2 November 1677) was an English diplomat and politician who sat in the House of Commons between 1614 and 1625 and then succeeded to the peerage as Earl of Leicester.

Life
Sidney was born at Baynard's Castle in London, the son of Robert Sidney, 1st Earl of Leicester, and his first wife, Barbara Gamage. He was educated at Christ Church, Oxford. In 1610 he was created Knight of the Bath when Prince Henry was created Prince of Wales. He was elected Member of Parliament for Wilton in 1614.

Sidney served in the army in the Netherlands during his father's governorship of Flushing, and was given command of an English regiment in the Dutch service in 1616. In 1618 he became a member of Gray's Inn.

In 1620 he had a disagreement with James Hay, Viscount Doncaster, who was his brother-in-law, having married Lucy Percy. He wrote that Hay seemed cold to him, despite their wives being friendly. They argued at Petworth, Sidney struggled with Hay's servants and left his hat behind. Other guests made him feel at fault for arguing with a privy councillor.

He was elected one of the two knights of the shire for Kent in 1621. In 1624 he was elected as the member for Monmouthshire and was re-elected for that county in 1625. In 1626, he succeeded his father as Earl of Leicester In 1631, he began the construction of Leicester House, a huge mansion on the site of what is now Leicester Square in London. He was employed on a diplomatic mission to Denmark–Norway in 1632 and undertook further diplomatic work in France from 1636 to 1641.

Lord Leicester was then appointed Lord Lieutenant of Ireland in place of The Earl of Strafford. When the governorship of Dublin became vacant, Leicester appointed George Monck. Charles I, however, overruled the appointment in favour of Lord Lambart. In 1643 he resigned without having set foot in Ireland.

Lord Leicester died at Penshurst at the age of nearly 81. He was "esteemed of great learning, observation and veracity".

Family
In 1615, Sidney married Lady Dorothy Percy, the daughter of Henry Percy, 9th Earl of Northumberland and Dorothy Devereux, who was a daughter of Robert Devereux, 2nd Earl of Essex. They had twelve children, including:
 Lady Dorothy (1617–1683); married firstly Henry Spencer, 1st Earl of Sunderland (died 1643), and secondly Sir Robert Smith or Smythe.
 Philip (1619–1697), the 3rd Earl; married Lady Catherine Cecil, daughter of William Cecil, 2nd Earl of Salisbury.
 Henry Sidney, 1st Earl of Romney (1641–1704); died unmarried and without issue.
 Algernon (1622/3–1683); executed for his share in the Rye House Plot, died unmarried and without issue.
 Robert; died young.
 Lady Lucy (d. 1685); married Sir John Pelham, 3rd Baronet.

Philip and Algernon supported the Parliamentary cause in the English Civil War.

References

Further reading
Michael G. Brennan (2005).

 

1595 births
1677 deaths
2nd Earl of Leicester
Robert
English MPs 1614
English MPs 1621–1622
English MPs 1624–1625
English MPs 1625
English soldiers
17th-century English diplomats
Lords Lieutenant of Ireland
Expatriates of the Kingdom of England in the Dutch Republic